Railways Act (with its variations) is a stock short title used in India, Malaysia and the United Kingdom for legislation relating to railways.

List

India
The Indian Railways Act, 1890
The Railways Act, 1989

Malaysia
The Railways Act 1991
The Railways (Successor Company) Act 1991

United Kingdom
 The Railway Regulation Act 1844- An Act to attach certain Conditions to the Construction of future Railways
see also Parliamentary train
The Regulating the Gauge of Railways Act 1846 c. 57
The Railway Clearing Act 1850
The Railways Act 1873
The Light Railways Act 1896
The Railways Act 1921
The Transport Act 1947
The Railways Act 1993
The Railways and Transport Safety Act 2003
The Railways Act 2005

The Railway and Canal Traffic Acts 1854 to 1894 is the collective title of the following Acts:
The Railway and Canal Traffic Act 1854 (17 & 18 Vict c 31)
The Regulation of Railways Act 1873 (36 & 37 Vict c 48)
The Board of Trade Arbitrations Act 1874(37 & 38 Vict c 40), Part II
The Railway and Canal Traffic Act 1888 (51 & 52 Vict c 25)
The Railway and Canal Traffic Act 1892 (55 & 56 Vict c 44)
The Railway and Canal Traffic Act 1894 (57 & 58 Vict c 54)

The Railway Regulation Acts 1840 to 1893 is the collective title of the following Acts:
The Railway Regulation Act 1840 (3 & 4 Vict c 97)
The Railway Regulation Act 1842 (5 & 6 Vict c 55)
The Railway Regulation Act 1844 (7 & 8 Vict c 85)
The Regulation of Railways Act 1868 (31 & 32 Vict c 119)
The Regulation of Railways Act 1871 (34 & 35 Vict c 78)
The Railway Regulation Act (Returns of Signal Arrangements, Working, &c.) 1873 (36 & 37 Vict c 76)
The Regulation of Railways Act 1889 (52 & 53 Vict c 57)
The Railway Regulation Act 1893 (56 & 57 Vict c 29)

See also
List of short titles
Bills C-1 and S-1

References

External links
 House of Lords Archive:  An Act for Regulating Railways 1840
 House of Lords Archive: An Act to attach certain Conditions to the Construction of future Railways 1844
 House of Lords Archive Railway Clearing Act 1850
 House of Lords Archive: An Act for regulating the Gauge of Railways 1850
 House of Lords Archive:  Regulation of Railways Act, 1889

Lists of legislation by short title and collective title
 
Railway acts